Sekou Kimathi Sinclair Smith (May 15, 1972 – January 26, 2021) was an American sportswriter who covered the National Basketball Association (NBA).

Early life and education 
Smith was a native of Grand Rapids, Michigan. He graduated from Jackson State University in 1997 with a bachelor’s degree in communications.

Career 
Smith covered college football, basketball, and baseball for The Clarion-Ledger from 1994 until 2001, during his university studies and after. Smith was an NBA beat writer for four years each at The Indianapolis Star and The Atlanta Journal-Constitution. He started working at Turner Broadcasting as a senior analyst for NBA Digital in November 2009. He also worked as the creator and author of Sekou Smith’s Hang Time Blog on NBA.com, a host of The Hang Time Podcast, and a Senior Analyst on NBA TV’s The Beat. Smith was one of the small number of journalists inside the NBA's bubble at the Walt Disney World Resort in Orlando, Florida covering the 2020 playoffs and the NBA Finals.

Smith mentored many colleagues as a member of the National Association of Black Journalists.

Personal life and death 
Smith was married to his wife, Heather, with whom he had three children.

He died of complications from COVID-19 in Marietta, Georgia, on January 26, 2021, at the age of 48.

References 

1972 births
2021 deaths
20th-century American journalists
20th-century American male writers
21st-century American journalists
21st-century American male writers
African-American sports journalists
American male journalists
American sportswriters
Deaths from the COVID-19 pandemic in Georgia (U.S. state)
Jackson State University alumni
Sportswriters from Michigan
Place of death missing
The Atlanta Journal-Constitution people
The Clarion-Ledger people
The Indianapolis Star people
Writers from Grand Rapids, Michigan
21st-century African-American people